The 1951 BYU Cougars football team was an American football team that represented Brigham Young University as a member of the Skyline Conference during the 1951 college football season. In their third season under head coach Chick Atkinson, the Cougars compiled an overall record of 6–3–1 with a mark of 2–3–1 against conference opponents, finished fifth in the Skyline, and outscored opponents by a total of 215 to 184.

Ray Oliverson was the team captain. He was also selected as a first-team halfback on the 1951 All-Skyline Conference team selected by the Associated Press (AP). BYU's Jae Ballif also won first-team honors on the AP all-conference team as a defensive halfback.

Schedule

References

BYU
BYU Cougars football seasons
BYU Cougars football